The 2019 Enugu State House of Assembly election was held on March 9, 2019, to elect members of the Enugu State House of Assembly in Nigeria. All the 24 seats were up for election in the Enugu State House of Assembly. PDP won all the 24 available seats. 

Upon the opening of the 7th State House of Assembly, Edward Uchenna Ubosi (PDP-Enugu East I) was elected as Speaker of the House while Uche Ugwu (PDP-Udi North) and Melitus Ikechukwu Ezeugwu (PDP-Udenu) became Deputy Speaker and House Leader, respectively.

Results

Aninri 
A total of 12 candidates registered with the Independent National Electoral Commission to contest in the election. PDP candidate Okwu Chinedu won the election, defeating APC Ozoigwe Oleh Romanju and 10 other party candidates. Chinedu received 94.9% of the votes, while Romanju received 4.3%.

Enugu North 
A total of 16 candidates registered with the Independent National Electoral Commission to contest in the election. PDP candidate Onoh Ibenaku won the election, defeating YPP Martins Ndubueze Neboh and 14 other party candidates. Ibenaku received 93.4% of the votes, while Neboh received 2.7%.

Enugu East I 
A total of 14 candidates registered with the Independent National Electoral Commission to contest in the election. PDP candidate Ubosi Edward won the election, defeating YPP Imaria Glyns O. and 12 other party candidates. Edward received 97.4% of the votes, while Glyns received 0.9%.

Enugu East II 
A total of 10 candidates registered with the Independent National Electoral Commission to contest in the election. PDP candidate Ugwu Hillary won the election, defeating ADC Mba Emmanuel O. and 8 other party candidates. Hillary received 93.3% of the votes, while Emmanuel received 3.3%.

Awgu South 
A total of 10 candidates registered with the Independent National Electoral Commission to contest in the election. PDP candidate Chukwuobasi Johnson won the election, defeating SDP Emmanuel Okeke Uwa and 8 other party candidates. Johnson received 68.5% of the votes, while Uwa received 19.7%.

Awgu North 
A total of 13 candidates registered with the Independent National Electoral Commission to contest in the election. PDP candidate Ezeh Jane won the election, defeating APC Udeh Anthony Osinachi and 11 other party candidates. Jane received 84.6% of the votes, while Osinachi received 3.9%.

Igbo Etiti West 
A total of 14 candidates registered with the Independent National Electoral Commission to contest in the election. PDP candidate Akadu James O. won the election, defeating APC Onodagu Chibuike J. and 12 other party candidates. James received 78.4%% of the votes, while Chibuike received 14.6%.

Igbo Etiti East 
A total of 11 candidates registered with the Independent National Electoral Commission to contest in the election. PDP candidate Ezenta Ugochukwu Ezeani won the election, defeating ADC Okpokoeze Donatus and 9 other party candidates. Ezeani received 87.8% of the votes, while Donatus received 7.5%.

Ezeagu 
A total of 16 candidates registered with the Independent National Electoral Commission to contest in the election. PDP candidate Obieze Chima won the election, defeating APC Ogbuke John C. and 14 other party candidates. Chima received 97.4% of the votes, while John received 1.5%.

Enugu South I 
A total of 19 candidates registered with the Independent National Electoral Commission to contest in the election. PDP candidate Ngene Sam O. won the election, defeating ANN Nnamani Chukwunonso Nnene and 17 other party candidates. Sam received 85% of the votes, while Nnene received 8.7%.

Enugu South II 
A total of 11 candidates registered with the Independent National Electoral Commission to contest in the election. PDP candidate Ugwu Onyinye won the election, defeating APC Chime Ifeanyichukwu Edeth and 9 other party candidates. Onyinye received 89.2% of the votes, while Edeth received 9.1%.

Nkanu East 
A total of 15 candidates registered with the Independent National Electoral Commission to contest in the election. PDP candidate Nwajiofor Paul won the election, defeating APC Nyute Benjamin and 13 other party candidates. Paul received 95.7% of the votes, while Benjamin received 3.8%.

Isi Uzo 
A total of 11 candidates registered with the Independent National Electoral Commission to contest in the election. PDP candidate Ugwueze Chijioke won the election, defeating APGA Macdonald E. Okwor and 9 other party candidates. Chijioke received 84.2% of the votes, while Okwor received 14.2%.

Igbo Eze South 
A total of 6 candidates registered with the Independent National Electoral Commission to contest in the election. PDP candidate Madu Emeka won the election, defeating APC Asogwa Ogbogu Prince and 4 other party candidates. Emeka received 97.7% of the votes, while Prince received 2.2%.

Igbo Eze North I 
A total of 14 candidates registered with the Independent National Electoral Commission to contest in the election. PDP candidate Ugwuanyi Ethel O. won the election, defeating APC Odo Okwudili and 12 other party candidates. Ethel received 94.4% of the votes, while Okwudili received 5.1%.

Igbo Eze North II 
A total of 10 candidates registered with the Independent National Electoral Commission to contest in the election. PDP candidate Ugwu Innocent Emeka won the election, defeating APC Eze Joel Chukwudi and 8 other party candidates. Emeka received 96.1% of the votes, while Chukwudi received 3.5%.

Udenu 
A total of 12 candidates registered with the Independent National Electoral Commission to contest in the election. PDP candidate Ezeugwu Ikechukwu won the election, defeating APC Eze Jude Onyenechi and 10 other party candidates. Ikechukwu received  96.6% of the votes, while Onyenechi received 2.9%.

Oji River 
A total of 13 candidates registered with the Independent National Electoral Commission to contest in the election. PDP candidate Mbah Geoffrey won the election, defeating APC Onyebuchi Michel and 11 other party candidates. Geoffrey received 94.1% of the votes, while Michel received 4.8%.

Nsukka West 
A total of 8 candidates registered with the Independent National Electoral Commission to contest in the election. PDP candidate Ugwuwerua Emma won the election, defeating APC Ugwuja George and 6 other party candidates. Emma received 96.4% of the votes, while George received 3%.

Nsukka East 
A total of 13 candidates registered with the Independent National Electoral Commission to contest in the election. PDP candidate Nwamba Christian won the election, defeating APC Omeje Ikpechukwu Evans and 11 other party candidates. Christian received 92.4% of the votes, while Evans received 4.7%.

Nkanu West 
A total of 17 candidates registered with the Independent National Electoral Commission to contest in the election. PDP candidate Aniagu Iloabuchi D. won the election, defeating APC Richard Ngene C. and 15 other party candidates. Iloabuchi received 97.3% of the votes, while Ngene received 1.6%.

Uzo Uwani 
A total of 11 candidates registered with the Independent National Electoral Commission to contest in the election. PDP candidate Okika Josephat E. won the election, defeating APC Ugwuoke Blessing C. and 9 other party candidates. Josephat received 97.8% of the votes, while Blessing received 1.4%.

Udi South 
A total of 15 candidates registered with the Independent National Electoral Commission to contest in the election. PDP candidate Eneh Chukwuka won the election, defeating APC Edozie Chukwuedozie Confidence and 13 other party candidates. Chukwuka received 90% of the votes, while Confidence received 3.6%.

Udi North 
A total of 16 candidates registered with the Independent National Electoral Commission to contest in the election. PDP candidate Ugwu Uche won the election, defeating APC Ozongwu Magnus Okwu and 14 other party candidates. Uche received 86.4% of the votes, while Okwu received 6.4%.

References 

Enugu State House of Assembly elections
Enugu State
March 2015 events in Nigeria